Forever Young is a 2022 French comedy-drama film directed by Valeria Bruni Tedeschi. It was nominated for the Palme d'Or at the 2022 Cannes Film Festival. It is a semi-autobiographical account of Tedeschi's experiences as a young actress in the 1980s.

Plot
Set in the late 1980s, the film follows a group of young actors who enter into Les Amandiers, the prestigious acting school founded by Patrice Chéreau and Pierre Romans. Over the course of a few months, these young people form new friendships, discover the realities of love and come of age, all set to the backdrop of a changing culture.

Cast
 Nadia Tereszkiewicz as Stella
 Sofiane Bennacer as Étienne
 Louis Garrel as Patrice Chéreau
 Micha Lescot as Pierre Romans
 Clara Bretheau as Adèle
 Vassili Schneider as Victor
 Eva Danino as Claire
 Oscar Lesage as Stéphane
 Sarah Henochsberg as Laurence
 Liv Henneguier as Juliette
 Baptiste Carrion-Weiss as Baptiste
 Alexia Chardard as Camille
 Léna Garrel as Anaïs
 Noham Edje as Franck
 Suzanne Lindon as The Waitress
 Franck Demules as The Guardian
 Isabelle Renauld as Chéreau's Assistant 
 Sandra Nkaké as Susan
 Bernard Nissille as Gaspard
 Lolita Chammah as Costume Designer (non-speaking)

References

External links
 

2022 films
2022 drama films
French drama films
2020s French-language films
Films directed by Valeria Bruni Tedeschi
2020s French films